Enterprise Rancheria is the landbase for the Estom Yumeka Maidu Tribe, located in Butte County, near Oroville, California. The nearest outside communities are Berry Creek and Forbestown.  As of the 2010 Census the population was 1. The Estom Yumeka Maidu Tribe itself has around 1000 citizens.

References

External links
 

Maidu
Geography of Butte County, California
Federally recognized tribes in the United States